The following is a list of massacres that have occurred in Roman Judea prior to the establishment of the Roman province of Syria Palæstina.

 For massacres that took place in Southern Levant prior to World War I, see List of massacres in Ottoman Syria 
 For massacres that took place in the Mandatory Palestine, see List of killings and massacres in Mandatory Palestine. 
 For massacres that took place in modern Syria, see List of massacres in Syria.
 For massacres that took place during the 1948 Palestine War, see Killings and massacres during the 1948 Palestine War.  
 For massacres that have occurred in Israel following its declaration of independence, see List of massacres in Israel. 
 For massacres that have occurred in the West Bank and the Gaza Strip since 1994, see List of massacres in Palestinian Territories.
 For massacres that have occurred during the Syrian Civil War since 2011, see List of massacres during the Syrian Civil War.

References

Judea, Roman
Judea (Roman province)